Acacia cowaniana, commonly known as Cowan's wattle, is a shrub or tree of the genus Acacia and the subgenus Plurinerves that is endemic to an area of south west Australia.

Description
Like most species of Acacia it has phyllodes rather than true leaves. It blooms from April to June and produces white-yellow flowers.

Taxonomy
The species was first formally described by the botanist Bruce Maslin in 1990 as part of the work Acacia Miscellany. Three new Western Australian species with affinities to A. wilhelmiana (Leguminosae: Mimosoideae: Section Plurinerves) from Western Australia as published in the journal Nuytsia. It was reclassified as Racosperma cowanianum in 2003 by Leslie Pedley then transferred back to genus Acacia in 2006. The type specimen was collected from near Jilakin Rock in 1986 by Bruce Maslin.

Distribution
It is native to an area in the Wheatbelt region of Western Australia where it occurs among granite outcrops in pockets of soils. It is only found in a few populations located between Kellerberrin and Kulin.

See also
List of Acacia species

References

cowaniana
Acacias of Western Australia
Taxa named by Bruce Maslin
Plants described in 1990